Scott Curry (born December 25, 1975, Conrad, Montana) was an American football offensive tackle in the National Football League. He was drafted by the Green Bay Packers in the 6th round of the 1999 NFL Draft. Curry played in 5 games for the Packers in 1999. He was active with the Packers in 2000 but did not play, and he left the NFL after the 2000 season. He attended high school in Valier, Montana and college at the University of Montana.

References

1975 births
Living people
American football offensive tackles
Green Bay Packers players
Scottish Claymores players
People from Conrad, Montana
Players of American football from Montana